Wilson Soto Molina is a Puerto Rican politician and former mayor of Cataño.

Soto was sworn in as mayor of Cataño in 2003, after longtime mayor Edwin Rivera Sierra presented his resignation. He was then elected officially at the 2004 general elections. Soto ran for reelection at the 2008 general elections, but lost to the candidate of the Popular Democratic Party, José Rosario.

After that, Soto was indicted on nine charges of bribery and violation of the code of ethics. In 2011, he was found guilty of all the charges and sentenced to four years in prison. Soto still maintains his innocence.

References

External links

Mayors of places in Puerto Rico
Living people
New Progressive Party (Puerto Rico) politicians
People from Cataño, Puerto Rico
Puerto Rico politicians convicted of crimes
Year of birth missing (living people)